Kilmoyley are a Gaelic Athletic Association club in County Kerry, Ireland. They are located in North Kerry, the main hurling area of Kerry and are primarily hurlers. They are one of the most successful hurling clubs in Kerry.

The club competes in competitions organized by Kerry GAA county board and the North Division hurling board.

Hurling Titles

 Kerry Senior Club Hurling Championship (26) 1890, 1892, 1894, 1895, 1900, 1901, 1905, 1907, 1910, 1914, 1948, 1962, 1963, 1964, 1970, 1971, 2001, 2002, 2003, 2004, 2008, 2009, 2015, 2016, 2020, 2021.
 Munster Senior Hurling League: (1) 2003
 Munster Intermediate Club Hurling Championship (1) 2021
 All-Ireland Intermediate Club Hurling Championship Runners-up 2022
 Kerry Under-21 hurling championship (5) 1981, 1990, 1993, 1998, 2006
 Kerry Minor Hurling Championship (13) 1953, 1964, 1978, 1980, 1987, 1989, 1990, 1991, 1993, 1995, 2000, 2007, 2009
 Kerry Intermediate Hurling Championship (7) 1985, 1986, 1987, 1988, 1992, 1994, 2003
 Kerry Junior Hurling Championship (1) 1997
 Kerry Senior Hurling League Div I (11) 1986, 1987, 1988, 1990, 1993, 1999, 2000, 2001, 2003, 2004, 2007
 Kerry Senior Hurling League Div II (1) 1986 
 Kerry Senior hurling League Div III (3) 1987, 1991, 1995
 Kerry Minor Hurling League Div I (5) 1987, 1990, 1995, 1996, 1999
 Kerry Minor Hurling League Div II (1) 1998, 2004
 Kerry Féile na nGael (13) 1974,1978, 1979, 1980, 1981, 1983, 1985, 1986, 1987, 1990, 1991, 2005, 2006
 All-Ireland Féile na nGael (2) 1987 (Div III), 1991 (Div IV)
 All-Ireland Oireachtas 2001, 2003

County championship winning captains

Senior

 1890: Jack W. Quane
 1892: Jack W. Quane
 1894: John Gurnett
 1895: Jack W. Quane
 1900: Patsy O'Rourke
 1901: Patsy O'Rourke
 1905: Tim Meehan
 1907: Pat Meehan
 1910: Tim Meehan
 1914: Tim Meehan
 1948: Mick McGrath
 1962: Michael Curran
 1963: John Flanagan
 1964: Michael Regan
 1970: Patsy O'Connor
 1971: Mike Fitzgerald
 2001: James McCarthy
 2002: Ian Brick
 2003: Maurice Murnane
 2004:Shane Brick
 2008: Tom Murnane
 2009: Micheal Regan
 2015: Sean Maunsell 
 2016: Aiden McCabe
 2020: John B O’Halloran
 2021: Flor McCarthy

Under 21

 1981: John Godley
 1990: Michael Marshall
 1993: John Nolan
 1998: Micheál Regan
 2006: Tom Murnane

Minor

 1953: Denis Treacy
 1964: Michael Rahilly
 1978: Paddy Sullivan
 1980: Harry Young
 1987: Eddie Flaherty
 1989: Francis Maunsell
 1990: John Clifford
 1991: Kieran Treacy
 1993: James McCarthy
 1995: Tony Maunsell
 2000: Paul mccarthy 
 2007: David Fitzell
 2009: Tommy Maunsell

Notable players
Shane Brick
Tom Collins

Notable managers
Anthony Daly
John Meyler

References

External links
Official Kilmoyley GAA Club website

Gaelic games clubs in County Kerry
Hurling clubs in County Kerry